The Eli Lilly and Company-Elanco Research Award was a scientific award presented annually by the American Society for Microbiology (ASM) and sponsored by the Eli Lilly and Company and its subsidiary Elanco (which became an independent company in 2019).

The prize was first awarded in 1936. Recipients were given 5000 US dollars (as of 2011). It honored young scientists under the age of 45. The award's purpose was not to compare the research of the younger scientists to the research of older scientists, but to encourage originality and independent thinking.

The award was discontinued after the last award in 2018. Information about the award can no longer be found on the ASM website.

Recipients
The following people received the Eli Lilly and Company-Elanco Research Award:

 1936 Harry Eagle
 1937 Frank L. Horsfall
 1938 Jerome T. Syverton
 1939 John G. Kidd
 1940 D. Wayne Woolley
 1941 Alwin M. Pappenheimer
 1942 Harland G. Wood
 1945 Esmond E. Snell
 1946 Maclyn McCarty
 1947 Wayne W. Umbreit
 1948 Alan W. Bernheimer
 1949 Elvin A. Kabat
 1950 Roger Y. Stanier
 1951 Seymour S. Cohen
 1952 J. Oliver Lampen
 1953 Joshua Lederberg (Nobel Prize in Physiology or Medicine, 1958)
 1954 James W. Moulder
 1955 Willis A. Wood
 1956 Melvin Cohn
 1957 Henry Koffler
 1958 W. Wilbur Ackermann
 1959 Charles Yanofsky
 1960 Wallace P. Rowe
 1961 Harry Rubin
 1962 Norton D. Zinder
 1963 John J. Holland
 1964 Matthew Meselson
 1965 Karl Gordon Lark
 1966 Frederick C. Neidhardt
 1967 Brian J. McCarthy
 1968 John J. Cebra
 1969 David Schlessinger
 1970 Jonathan R. Beckwith
 1971 David L. Baltimore (Nobel Prize in Physiology or Medicine, 1975)
 1972 R. John Collier
 1973 Leland H. Hartwell (Nobel Prize in Physiology or Medicine, 2001)
 1974 Joseph R. Kates
 1975 G. Wesley Hatfield
 1976 Ronald W. Davis
 1977 Alice S. Huang
 1978 David L. Botstein
 1979 Winston J. Brill
 1980 Edward M. Scolnick
 1981 Tom Maniatis
 1982 Thomas E. Shenk
 1983 Ira Herskowitz
 1984 Linda L. Randall
 1985 Martha M. Howe
 1986 Mark M. Davis
 1987 Randy W. Schekman (Nobel Prize in Physiology or Medicine, 2013)
 1988 Elizabeth H. Blackburn (Nobel Prize in Physiology or Medicine, 2009)
 1989 Steven L. McKnight
 1990 Kevin Struhl
 1991 John J. Mekalanos
 1992 Vincent Racaniello
 1993 Ralph Isberg
 1994 David H. Beach
 1995 John J. Monaco
 1996 Daniel A. Portnoy
 1997 Alan D. Grossman
 1998 Scott J. Hultgren
 1999 John A. T. Young
 2000 Gisela Storz
 2001 Tania A. Baker
 2002 Andrew Camilli
 2003 Angelika Amon
 2004 Adrian R. Ferré-D'Amaré
 2005 Ronald R. Breaker
 2006 Bonnie Lynn Bassler
 2007 Craig Russell Roy
 2008 Dianne K. Newman
 2009 Joseph L. DeRisi
 2010 Paul Bieniasz
 2011 Christine Jacobs-Wagner
 2012 Akiko Iwasaki
 2013 Martin Polz
 2014 Katherine A. Fitzgerald
 2015 Vanessa Sperandio
 2016 Erica Ollmann Saphire
 2017 Harmit Malik
 2018 Thirumala-Devi Kanneganti

References

Awards established in 1936
Awards disestablished in 2019
Microbiology awards